Danat Al Emarat Hospital (DAE) or Mother of Pearl is a hospital dedicated to women and children in Abu Dhabi, United Arab Emirates.

Danat Al Emarat opened its doors in August 2015 and specializes in high-risk pregnancy and general delivery, adult and pediatric intensive care units, and surgical procedures and features a 24-hour walk in clinic.

Women's specialty services 
Medical services offered at Danat Al Emarat for women include the following:

Obstetrics & Gynecology: Family Planning, Fetal Medicine, Gynecology, Gyne-urology Clinic, Labor and Delivery, Maternity, Obstetrics and Reproductive Medicine.

Women's Medical Services: Allergy & Immunology, Antenatal & Postnatal Clinic, Cardiology & Cardiopulmonary Clinic, Community Health, Dermatology, Dietetics, Endocrinology, Endoscopy, Internal Medicine, Osteoporosis, Pain Management, Weight Management and Woman's Health Screening.

Women's Surgical Services: Gastroenterology, General Surgery, Minimally Invasive Surgery, Obstetrics & Gynecology Surgery and Plastics & Aesthetics Surgery.

Radiology: Bone Densitometry, Cardiopulmonary Screening, General Imaging, Mammography, Ultrasound and Uro-Dynamics.

Children's specialty services 
Medical services offered at Danat Al Emarat for children include the following:

Children's Medical Services: Child Development, Neonatology, Neonatology and Neonatal Intensive Care Unit (NICU), Pediatrics, Pediatric Cardiology, Pediatric urology, Pediatric Pulmonology, Pediatric Endocrinology and Pediatric Intensive Care Unit.

Pediatric Surgery Specialties: Neonatal Surgery, General Pediatric Surgery, Pediatric Thoracic Surgery, Pediatric Urology, Laparoscopy and Cystoscopy, Pediatric Urodynamic Study and Multidisciplinary Antenatal Counseling.

Pediatric Surgical Conditions and Procedures: Circumcision, Inguinal Hernia & Hydrocele, Undescended Testis, Hypospadias, Urinary Incontinence, Hydronephrosis, Vesico-Ureteric Reflux, Appendicitis, Intussusception, Anorectal Malformations, Hirschprung's Disease, Hepatobiliary Surgery, Umbilical Hernia, Gastroschisis and Omphalocele, Intestinal Atresia, Esophageal Atresia, Congenital Diaphragmatic Hernia, Congenital Lung Malformations, Soft Tissue Swelling, Sclerotherapy for Vascular Malformations and Gastroesophageal Reflux.

Facilities 
The medical facilities at the hospital consist of 5 operation theaters, 10 delivery suites, 80 baby cribs, an Adult Intensive Care Unit (ICU), a Pediatric Intensive Care Unit (PICU), a Neonatal Intensive Care Unit (NICU) consisting of 20 beds, 5 pediatric clinics, 16 women outpatient clinics, a 24/7 outpatient clinic, Laboratory & Imaging services, Pharmacy services and retail & leisure facilities. 

On 23 December 2018, Health care provider United Eastern Medical Services (UE Medical) announced the expansion of 100 new beds in the construction of a new tower which will be completed by 2020, as a part of a DH300 million expansion.

Affiliated bodies 
United Eastern Medical Services (UEMedical), Danat Al Emarat's parent company, is a privately owned Healthcare Development & Investment Company in Abu Dhabi.

HealthPlus Network, Danat Al Emarat's sister company, and one of UEMedical's companies, are a series of outpatient centers based in Abu Dhabi. It consists of HealthPlus Woman & Fertility Center, HealthPlus Diabetes and Endocrinology Center, HealthPlus Children Specialty Center and HealthPlus Family Center.

Moorfields Eye Hospital Centre, Abu Dhabi, a branch of Moorfields London, one of the oldest and largest eye hospitals in the world, is in partnership with Danat Al Emarat.

See also 
 List of hospitals in the United Arab Emirates
 HealthPlus
 Moorfields Eye Hospital

References

External links 
Official website

Hospital buildings completed in 2011
Hospitals in the United Arab Emirates
2015 establishments in the United Arab Emirates